A millennium is 1000 years.

Millennium may also refer to:

Religion 
 Millennialism, describing the 1000-year reign of Christ
 Millenarianism, the belief by a group in a coming major transformation of society after which all things will be changed
 Tertio millennio adveniente, an apostolic letter in preparation for the Roman Catholic Church's Great Jubilee

Transportation 
 Edel Millennium, a South Korean paraglider design
 Millennium (ship), a cruise ship
 Millennium train, an electric train run by Sydney Trains in Sydney

Software 
 Millennium bug, aka Y2K or Year 2000 problem, a data storage problem from the practice of abbreviating a four-digit year to two digits
 Windows ME, Windows Millennium Edition, an operating system
 Millennium, an integrated library system software package published by Innovative Interfaces, Inc.

Books

Comics 
 Millennium (comics), a series produced by DC Comics
 Millennium Publications, a defunct comic book publisher
 Millennium, Vampire Nazi regiment in the Hellsing manga series
 Millennium Items, magical relics in the manga series Yu-Gi-Oh!

Fiction 
 The Millennium, a 1924 novel by Upton Sinclair
 Millennium, a 1976 novel in the Chet Kinsman series by Ben Bova
 Millennium (novel), a 1983 science fiction novel by John Varley
 Millennium, a 1995 novel by Jack Anderson
 Millennium (novel series), circa 2005, a series of novels spawning from a trilogy created by Stieg Larsson, also made into films, and continued by others

Non-fiction 
 Millennium: A History of Our Last Thousand Years, a 1995 book by Felipe Fernández-Armesto
 Millennium (Holland book), a 2008 book by historian Tom Holland
 Millennium: Journal of International Studies, an academic periodical published from 1971–present

Television and film 
 Millennium (film), 1989 film based on the novel "Air Raid" by John Varley
 Millennium (TV series), 1996 television series by The X-Files creator Chris Carter
 Millennium (miniseries), 2010 Swedish miniseries based on the film adaptations of Stieg Larsson's Millennium series
 "The Millennium" (Seinfeld), 1997 episode from the eighth season
 "Millennium" (The X-Files), 1999 episode from the seventh season
 CNN Millennium, 1999 television series on human history from the 11th to the 20th centuries.
 Millennium: Tribal Wisdom and the Modern World, 1992 documentary series by anthropologist David Maybury-Lewis
 Millennium Entertainment, American independent film distributor
 Millennium Falcon, fictional starship from the Star Wars films

Music 
 Millennium Records, a record label

Bands
 The Millennium (band), a 1960s band led by Curt Boettcher
 Millennium (Indian band), a heavy metal band from Bangalore, India
 Millenium (Polish band), a progressive rock band from Poland

Albums
 Millennium (Backstreet Boys album), 1999
 Millennium (Earth, Wind & Fire album), 1993
 Millennium (Front Line Assembly album), 1994
 Millennium (Monstrosity album), 1996

Songs
 "Millennium" (Front Line Assembly song), a 1994 industrial metal song
 "Millennium" (song), a 1998 song by Robbie Williams
 "Millennium", 1994 song by Killing Joke from the album Pandemonium

Video games 
 Millennium 2.2, a 1989 resource management game for Atari ST, Amiga and the PC
 Millennia: Altered Destinies, a PC game created by Take 2 Interactive in 1995
 Millennium (video game series), a Japanese series launched in 2009

Companies, countries and other organizations 
 Millennium BCP, a private bank in Portugal
 Millennium Chemicals, a subsidiary of Lyondell Chemical Company
 Millennium Interactive, a former games company, maker of James Pond and other games
 Millennium Development Goals, a compact among nations to end human poverty
 Millennium Kids, an international youth empowerment environmental organization
 Millennium Management, LLC, a hedge fund and a multistrategy investment management firm
 Millennium Media, an American film studio
 Millennium Pictures, an Australian production company
 Millennium (publisher), an imprint of UK publisher Orion Books
 White House Millennium Council (United States)
 Millennium Pharmaceuticals, a biopharmaceutical company in Cambridge, MA
 Millennium & Copthorne Hotels, a global hospitality company
 Tokio Millennium Re Ltd., a reinsurance company
 Millennium Group, a fictional centuries old secret society and criminal investigative consulting firm in the Millennium television series
 Millennium Science Initiative, an international project to build scientific research capability in Brazil, Chile, and Uruguay

Places 
 Millennium Park, Chicago park and entertainment venue
 Millennium High School (disambiguation), several US high schools
 Millennium (planet) or Tau Boötis Ab, an extrasolar planet in the Tau Boötis system
 Millennium Force, a roller coaster at Cedar Point in Sandusky, Ohio
 Millennium  Stadium in Cardiff, Wales, UK
 Millennium Tower (disambiguation)
 Millennium Transmitter, broadcast transmitter tower of ABS-CBN Corporation in the Philippines

Events 
 Millennium celebrations, a worldwide series of events celebrating New Year's Eve 1999–2000
 Millennium Summit, a meeting among several leaders from September 6–8, 2000
 Operation Millennium, a very large air raid in the Bombing of Cologne in World War II
 Millennium Magic, a UK Rugby League event
 Millennium '73, a religious festival held by the Divine Light Mission at Astrodome featuring Guru Maharaj Ji
 Walt Disney World Millennium Celebration a celebration at Walt Disney World for the year 2000
 2000 millennium attack plots, a series of Islamist terror plots planned around New Year's Eve 1999–2000

Prizes 
 Millennium Prize Problems, seven problems in mathematics stated by the Clay Mathematics Institute
 Millennium Technology Prize, a technology prize awarded by Technology Academy Finland

Other 
 Millennium stamp, a postage stamp issued to celebrate the beginning of the 3rd millennium, or to commemorate a millennium associated with a country's history
 New Millennium Program, a NASA program to test new technologies
 Millennium, an unusually strong beer made by Boston Beer Company
 Millennium Run, also known as Millennium simulation, an astrophysical simulation created to investigate how the universe evolved over time

See also 
 
 
 Millennium Tower (disambiguation), the name of a number of buildings around the world
 Millennium Park (disambiguation), a few parks in North America
 Millennium Bank (disambiguation)
 Millennium Bridge (disambiguation)
 Millennium Institute (disambiguation)
 Willennium, a 1999 album by Will Smith